Dubrov is a Slavic masculine surname, its feminine counterpart is Dubrova. Notable people with the surname include:

Anton Dubrov (born 1995), Belarusian tennis coach
Denys Dubrov (born 1989), Ukrainian Paralympic swimmer 
Maryna Dubrova (born 1978), Ukrainian long-distance runner